The File on Devlin is a 1969 American TV film for the Hallmark Hall of Fame, and was directed by George Schaefer. It was based on a novel by Catherine Gaskin.

Cast
Judith Anderson
Elizabeth Ashley
David McCallum
Helmut Dantine
Donald Moffatt

Production
The novel was published in 1965.

George Schaefer had just directed the feature film Pendulum. He called the film "an old fashioned spy story with a mysterious disappearance, an old castle, dark corridors and secret passages, great fun."

Elizabeth Ashley made it after having been retired for five years. Rehearsals started in July 1969, and it was mostly shot in the studio with two days location.

Reception
One review called it "a thriller that thrilled indifferently." The New York Times called it "an overstuffed, improbable bit of claptrap without suspense, wit or intelligence."

References

External links
File on Devlin at IMDb

1969 films
1969 television films
Hallmark Hall of Fame episodes
Films directed by George Schaefer